Margherita Guarducci (20 December 1902, in Florence – 2 September 1999, in Rome) was an Italian archaeologist, classical scholar, and epigrapher. She was a major figure in several crucial moments of the 20th century academic community. A student of Federico Halbherr, she edited his works after his death. She was the first woman to lead archaeological excavations at the Vatican, succeeding Ludwig Kaas, and completed the excavations on Saint Peter's tomb, identifying finds as relics of Saint Peter. She has also engaged in discussions on the authenticity of the Praeneste fibula, arguing that its inscription is a forgery.

Background

She was one of the top archaeologists of the Italian Archaeological Mission at Crete sponsored since 1910 by the Italian Archaeological School of Athens and in this capacity she published the work of Halbherr, her teacher – the Inscriptiones Creticæ, which included inscriptions in Greek and Latin on the island of Crete. She also worked on excavating artifacts related to the Gortyn code and is most noted for her publications regarding that inscription.

She obtained the designation of "docent" for the teaching of Epigraphy and Ancient Greek at the University of Rome "La Sapienza", holding that position until 1973. She continued to teach at the National School of Archeology of Rome, where she was also director, until 1978. While teaching Greek epigraphy she wrote four volumes on the subject and a compendium covering it from its origins to the late Roman Empire. At the end of her academic career she was named Professor Emerita at the University La Sapienza.

Since 1956 she was affiliated with the Accademia Nazionale dei Lincei, and appointed as a member of the Pontificia Accademia Romana di Archeologia in 1969.

Guarducci received two honorary degrees from the Università Cattolica di Milano and the  University of Rennes. Her works are now published by Istituto Poligrafico e Zecca dello Stato.

Crete and the Inscriptiones Creticæ

Receiving her diploma in Bologna in 1924, she attended the National School of Archeology in Rome from 1927 onwards, then proceeding to Athens. She was one of the first Italian women scholars to practice archaeology in Greece. She was appointed director of the Scuola Alessandro Della Seta and headed up the excavations on the island of Crete, a Greek territory since 1880.

There she met Federico Halbherr, a student of archeology from Florence's Domenico Comparetti. Guarducci began collaborating with Halbherr and became his favorite pupil during the excavations of the Cretan city of Gortyna. Her work there would continue after the death of Halbherr in 1930.

After Halbherr's death, the project fell under the direction of the Cretan Louis Pernier. Guarducci, whose interests lay primarily in epigraphy, took on the task of completing Halbherr's life's work which was to compile a single work of the Greek and Latin inscriptions of Crete after the 7th century BC. She began a long period of reconnaissance throughout the island, verifying the accuracy of the earlier readings of Halbherr, making corrections and adding new information. She continued this work full-time until 1931 when she was appointed the chair of Ancient Greek epigraphy at the Università di Roma "La Sapienza" where she served until 1950. It was here she was to publish the result of twenty years of research entitled the Inscriptiones Creticæ, which was published between 1935 and 1950. That work is considered the definitive collection of epigraphic entries, as well as the major compilation of the archeology and topography of the ancient city of Gortyna in Crete.

The work is in four volumes based on geography (Central Crete, Western Crete, Eastern Crete, and Gortyna), and bears the full title of Inscriptiones Creticæ, opera et consilio Friderici Halbherr collectae, Guarducci curavit Margarita, and is written in Latin, as required by the tradition of epigraphic corpora compiled by 'Academy in Berlin in the 19th century. Individual volumes bear the following titles (with year of publication):

 Tituli Cretæ mediæ præter Gortynios (Inscriptions of central Crete except Gortyna) (1935)
 Tituli Cretæ occidentalis (Inscriptions of western Crete) (1939)
 Tituli Cretæ orientalis (Inscriptions of eastern Crete) (1942)
 Tituli Gortynii (Inscriptions of Gortyna) (1950)

Each volume is accompanied by an extensive bibliography divided into two sections: archaeology and epigraphs. Introductions explain archaeological, topographical,  and antiquarian aspects of the areas treated. Entries include photographs, illustrations of epigraphs, transcripts, and extensive commentary.

Gortyn Code

In the fourth volume, which focuses on the city of Gortyna, Guarducci addresses the so-called Great Law (or Grand Inscription) of Gortyna (Inscr. Cret., Vol. IV, n.72), discovered by Federico Halbherr in 1884.

The inscription, part of a building used as the Odeon, is engraved on a concave wall about 8 m long and 175 cm high. It is grouped into twelve columns of boustrophedon writing. This is a type of writing that gradually alternates from left to right, writing a line backward, then reversing from right to left, for the entire text. It is likely that, on the left side of the wall, there were eight other columns which are now lost. This is not a real "code of laws," but rather, with the Latin, a saturated legum, i.e., a sparse collection of laws, updates of previous ancient laws and new laws focused on a specific topic. In the case of the Gortyn Code, the laws shown are mostly family law, as well as regarding economics and commerce.

Epigrafia Greca
Guarducci's long experience of teaching resulted in a work which is a now cornerstone in the teaching of Greek epigraphy: Epigrafia Greca, published between 1967 and 1978. By the author's design, it not only caters to an audience of scientists of antiquity but also to a general audience of students, amateurs and novices. According to Guarducci, epigraphy "is one of the most agile, fresh and fun disciplines of classical studies."

The work is in four volumes, differing in content as follows:
 Caratteri e storia della disciplina. La scrittura greca dalle origini all'età imperiale  (Character and history of the discipline. Greek writing from its origins to the imperial age) (1967)
 Epigrafi di carattere pubblico  (Epigraphs of a public nature) (1969)
 Epigrafi di carattere privato  (Epigraphs of a private nature) (1974)
 Epigrafi sacre, pagane e cristiane  (Sacred inscriptions, pagan and Christian) (1978)

The work, in a clear and straightforward style, presents actual cases alongside theoretical explanations, providing the reader with a veritable "small anthology" of Greek inscriptions, with photographs, transcriptions, translations, commentary, and very often bibliographic references. Each volume includes a large bibliography. Because of a limited edition, the volumes of Epigrafia Greca were soon exhausted. Guarducci felt the need to put her hand to a fifth volume which would serve as a "compendium" for the previous four. It was published in 1987 as L'epigrafia greca dalle origini al tardo impero (Greek epigraphy from its origins to the late Empire).

Publications by Margherita Guarducci
 Inscriptiones creticae opera et consilio Friderici Halbherr collectae. Curavit Margarita Guarducci, 4 voll, Libreria dello Stato, 1935-1950
 I graffiti sotto la confessione di San Pietro in Vaticano, 3 voll., Libreria Editrice Vaticana, 1958
 La cattedra di san Pietro nella scienza e nella fede, Ist. Poligrafico dello Stato, 1982
 La più antica icona di Maria. Un prodigioso vincolo fra Oriente e Occidente, Ist. Poligrafico dello Stato, 1989
 La tomba di san Pietro. Una straordinaria vicenda, Rusconi Ed., 1989
 San Pietro e sant'Ippolito: storia di statue famose in Vaticano, Ist. Poligrafico dello Stato, 1991
 Le chiavi sulla pietra. Studi, ricordi e documenti inediti intorno alla tomba di Pietro, Piemme, 1995
 Verità. Meditazioni, esperienze, documenti in tempi antichi e recenti, Ist. Poligrafico dello Stato, 1995
 Le reliquie di Pietro in Vaticano, Ist. Poligrafico dello Stato, 1995
 Epigrafia greca, 4 voll, Ist. Poligrafico dello Stato, 1995
 La tomba di san Pietro. Una straordinaria vicenda, Bompiani, 2000
 L'epigrafia greca dalle origini al tardo impero, Ist. Poligrafico dello Stato, 2005
 Fibula Prenestina. Tra antiquari, eruditi e falsari nella Roma dell'Ottocento, Bardi Editore 2007

Sources
 Giovanna Bandini, Lettere dall'Egeo: archeologhe italiane tra 1900 e 1950, 2003.
 M. L. Lazzarini, Margherita Guarducci e Creta, Accademia Nazionale dei Lincei, 2005.
 This article is a translation of Margherita Guarducci in the Italian Wikipedia, from May 2009 and February 2014.

External links
  by Margherita Guarducci
  by Gabriella Freccero
 "L'Apostolo Pietro e Margherita" by Franco Cardini
 
 

1902 births
1999 deaths
Archaeologists from Florence
Italian classical scholars
Women classical scholars
Latin epigraphers
Hellenic epigraphers
20th-century archaeologists
Italian women archaeologists